G.T.O. is the debut studio album by American band Ronny & the Daytonas, and was released in 1964 on Mala Records, MALA 4001.

Background
The group was formed in 1964 when Bill Justis (best known for his hit "Raunchy") became their producer and manager. They went into the studio and recorded a dozen songs primarily written by group member John "Bucky" Wilkin, who was the son of noted country music writer, Marijohn Wilkin. These were interspersed with several covers of surfing/car songs by artists such as Chuck Berry and Jan and Dean. The album and three singles all charted on US Billboard magazine charts. In 1989, vocalist/guitarist Alex Chilton of the 1960s era group The Box Tops, released a cover of "G.T.O." on his EP Black List.

Track listing
 "California Bound" (John "Bucky" Wilkin) – 2:14
 "Antique '32 Studebaker Dictator Coupe" (Jerry Dean Smith) – 2:05
 "Hot Rod Baby" (Smith) – 2:02
 "Little Rail Job" (Wilkin) – 2:19
 "Hey Little Girl" (Wilkin) – 2:16
 "Bucket "T”" (Don Atfled, Jan Berry, Roger Christian, Dean Torrence) – 2:37 
 "G.T.O." (Wilkin) – 2:30
 "The Little Sting Ray That Could" (Wayne Moss, Bobby Russell, Bergen White, Neil Wilburn) – 2:07
 "Surfin' in the Summertime" (Wilkin) – 1:50
 "Back in the U.S.A." (Chuck Berry) – 2:16
 "Hot Rod City" (Bill Justis, Wilkin) – 2:05 
 "Little Scrambler" (Wilkin) – 1:49

Personnel

Ronny and the Daytonas
 John "Bucky" Wilkin (aka Ronny) – vocals, guitar
 Paul Jensen – guitar, vocals
 Lee Kraft – guitar
 Thomas Ramey – bass, guitar
 Lynn Williams – drums

These were the Daytonas at the time of the recording, although many session musicians were also used. The touring band changed members frequently.

Technical
 Bill Justis – producer
 Win Bruder – cover design
 Buck Wilkin – photography

Charts

Album

Singles

References

1964 debut albums